Piotr Langosz (born 5 April 1951) is a Polish former basketball player. He competed in the men's tournament at the 1972 Summer Olympics.

References

1951 births
Living people
Polish men's basketball players
Olympic basketball players of Poland
Basketball players at the 1972 Summer Olympics
People from Świętochłowice